Urex de Medinaceli is a village under the local government of the municipality of Arcos de Jalón, in Soria, Spain.

References

Populated places in the Province of Soria
Towns in Spain